HD 70060 is a class A8V (white main-sequence) star in the constellation Puppis. Its apparent magnitude is 4.45 and it is approximately 93.4 light years away based on parallax.

References

Puppis
A-type main-sequence stars
Puppis, q
CD-36 4449
040706
3270
070060
Gliese and GJ objects